Eitea may refer to either of two demoi of ancient Attica:
 Eitea (Acamantis), of the phyle of Acamantis, and later of Antigonis and Hadrianis
 Eitea (Antiochis), of the phyle of Antiochis